Below is a list of Missouri state high school girls volleyball championships sanctioned by the Missouri State High School Activities Association since the organization began holding the tournaments in 1975.

Championships

Strafford forfeited its participation in the 2007-2008 MSHSAA State Volleyball Championships due to the use of an ineligible player. St. Mary’s (Independence), which lost to Strafford 25-23, 25-12 for third place on the court, is officially recognized as the third-place finisher, and the fourth-place position is hereby recognized as historically vacant.
MSHSAA implemented the best-of-five format during the 2020-2021 season; prior to this, it was best-of-three. MSHSAA also added another class (Class 5) the same season. During the same 2020-2021 season, some championship teams' records above are lower than normal; this is due to an unusually high amount of games and tournaments that had to be canceled during the regular season due to the coronavirus global pandemic.

Number of State Championships By School 
The following table lists the number of championships (first place finishes) that each school has won in the MSHSAA state tournament. (Updated to reflect the most recent 2022-2023 season results.)

Number of District Championships By School 
The following table lists the number of district championship titles (first place finishes) that each school has won since the MSHSAA was formed.

The numbers are current and have been updated to reflect the most recent district titles from the 2022-2023 season. (Updated October 30, 2022).

NOTES
Italicized indicates schools that have closed and are no longer in existence.
One of Strafford's district titles was revoked after the school allowed an ineligible player to participate in the state tournament.
Trinity Catholic High School's cumulative total (9) includes the district titles won by Rosary High School (3), Mercy High School (1), and St. Thomas Aquinas High School (1). These latter three schools were separate teams until they consolidated to form the current Trinity Catholic High School, which had won four district titles in its own right before the merger.
Joplin High School's cumulative total (9) includes the two district titles won by Parkwood High School, which closed and merged with the modern-day Joplin High School, which has won seven district titles in its own right before the merger.
Tarkio and Fairfax merged as a team during the 2021-2022 and 2022-2023 seasons due to an insufficient number of players to field a team at each school. The district championships for those seasons are included in both schools’ separate counts.

State Records
The following are individuals who hold records throughout the state of Missouri in high school volleyball. Records fall into three categories: offense (assists/sets and attacks/kills), defense (digs/receives and blocks) and serving (aces), and are broken down into three divisions: individual single-match records, individual season records, and individual career records.

Individual Single-Match Records

Attack Percentage: Minimum of 30 attempts

Individual Season Records

Per Games: Minimum of 65 games
Attack Percentage: Minimum of 500 attempts

Individual Career Records

Per Games: Minimum of 140 games
Attack Percentage: Minimum of 1,000 attempts

See also
 List of Missouri state high school boys basketball championships
 List of Missouri state high school girls basketball championships
 List of Missouri state high school baseball champions
 List of Missouri state high school football champions
 List of Missouri high schools by athletic conferences

References

Cham
high school volleyball
High school volleyball competitions in the United States